Lionelle Howard (1886 – 13 September 1930) was a British actor of the silent era who was born as Francis Nathan Coxin in Cirencester, Gloucestershire and died in Uxbridge, Middlesex. He appeared in a number of productions made by Astra Films in the years after the First World War.

Selected filmography
 Old St. Paul's (1914)
 Barnaby Rudge (1915)
 The Man Who Stayed at Home (1915)
 The Nightbirds of London (1915)
 The Golden Pavement (1915)
 Her Boy (1915)
 The Grand Babylon Hotel (1916)
 Trelawny of the Wells (1916)
 Annie Laurie (1916)
 A Bunch of Violets (1916)
 The Marriage of William Ashe (1916)
 Sowing the Wind (1916)
 Molly Bawn (1916)
 The House of Fortescue (1916)
 The White Boys (1916)
 The Failure (1917)
 The American Heiress (1917)
 Her Marriage Lines (1917)
 The Forest on the Hill (1919)
 Sheba (1919)
 Aunt Rachel (1920)
 A Bachelor Husband (1920)
 The Street of Adventure (1921)
 The Wonderful Year (1921)
 Cherry Ripe (1921)
 The Headmaster (1921)
 The Double Event (1921)
 No. 5 John Street (1921)
 Expiation (1922)
 Petticoat Loose (1922)
 Little Brother of God (1922)
 A Debt of Honour (1922)
 One Arabian Night (1923)
 The Fair Maid of Perth (1923)
 Wanted, a Boy (1924)
 The Flying Fifty-Five (1924)
 Not for Sale (1924)

References

External links

1886 births
1930 deaths
English male stage actors
English male film actors
English male silent film actors
People from Cirencester
20th-century English male actors